Allen Grove is a residential suburb of Kempton Park, in Gauteng province, South Africa, just north of the CBD. In the 2011 census the population counted 2,800.

References

Suburbs of Kempton Park, Gauteng